The Community Theatre is a historic theatre building at 207 West 2nd Avenue in Pine Bluff, Arkansas.  It is a two-story brick building, finished in stucco, with Moderne styling.  It was built in 1889, and housed first a furniture store, and then a five and dime, before being converted for theatrical use in the 1920s.  Its present Moderne styling dates to renovations made in the wake of a 1951 fire.

The building was listed on the National Register of Historic Places in 2004.

See also
National Register of Historic Places listings in Jefferson County, Arkansas

References

External links

Buildings and structures in Pine Bluff, Arkansas
National Register of Historic Places in Pine Bluff, Arkansas
Theatres completed in 1951
Theatres on the National Register of Historic Places in Arkansas
1951 establishments in Arkansas
Individually listed contributing properties to historic districts on the National Register in Arkansas